The 2017 Juss Sports Shanghai Masters was a professional ranking snooker tournament that took place in Shanghai, China. It was the ninth ranking event of the 2017/2018 season.

Qualifying for the tournament took place between 11 and 13 October in Wigan.

Ding Junhui was the defending champion, but withdrew from the tournament due to an eye infection.

Notably, Judd Trump won 20 consecutive frames in four matches before losing 3 frames to Jack Lisowski in the semi-finals.

Ronnie O'Sullivan captured his 30th ranking title by beating Judd Trump 10–3 in the final. With his win, O'Sullivan is ranked 2nd place on the all-time list of ranking event wins, only behind Stephen Hendry.

Prize fund
The breakdown of prize money for this year is shown below:

 Winner: £150,000
 Runner-up: £75,000
 Semi-final: £32,000
 Quarter-final: £18,000
 Last 16: £12,000
 Last 32: £7,000
 Last 64: £4,000

 Televised highest break: £3,000
 Total: £700,000

The "rolling 147 prize" for a maximum break stood at £5,000

Main draw

Notes

Final

Qualifying 
These matches were played between 11 and 13 October 2017 at the Robin Park Arena and Sports Centre in Wigan, England. All matches were the best of 9 frames.

Round 1

Round 2

Notes

Century breaks

Qualifying stage centuries
Total: 37

 142  Joe Perry
 141, 128  Sam Craigie
 140  Michael Georgiou
 137, 121  Jack Lisowski
 132, 109  Tom Ford
 131  Mark King
 129, 112, 109  Stuart Bingham
 128  Robbie Williams
 127  David Grace
 127  Jimmy Robertson
 126  Marco Fu
 122, 118  Thepchaiya Un-Nooh
 122, 105  Matthew Stevens
 119  Lyu Haotian
 117  Zhang Yong

 116  Daniel Wells
 111  Mark Williams
 107  Ross Muir
 107  Yuan Sijun
 106  Mark Davis
 106  Michael White
 105  Shaun Murphy
 104  Martin Gould
 102  Matthew Selt
 101, 100  Zhang Anda
 101  Fergal O'Brien
 100  Mark Allen
 100  Dominic Dale
 100  Ashley Hugill

Televised stage centuries
Total: 50

 144, 127, 123, 108  Ronnie O'Sullivan
 143  Ali Carter
 140  Michael White
 137, 111  Joe Perry
 137, 101  Graeme Dott
 135, 119, 107  Kurt Maflin
 135  Gerard Greene
 133, 115, 104, 102, 102, 100  Mark Allen
 133, 108  Mark Williams
 132, 120, 114  Mark Selby
 131, 125, 104  John Higgins

 125, 108, 105  Liang Wenbo
 124, 107  Marco Fu
 124, 102, 100  Martin Gould
 121  Barry Hawkins
 119, 114, 108, 105, 102  Judd Trump
 118, 107  Stephen Maguire
 117, 113, 102  Jack Lisowski
 110  Zhou Yuelong
 108  Sanderson Lam
 106  Jimmy Robertson

References

2017
2017 in snooker
2017 in Chinese sport
November 2017 sports events in China